Kaspar Albrecht (August 22, 1889 – March 25, 1970) was an Austrian architect and sculptor.

Biography 
Kaspar Albrecht grew up in a large family in Rehmen, Austria, in rather poor conditions in Bregenzerwald. He attended the State Trade School in Innsbruck from 1906 to 1910 to begin his artistic training. He then studied in Munich at the Municipal Commercial School and in Vienna with Josef Muellner at the Academy of Fine Arts . In addition to the sculptural work, he was also active architecturally.

During World War I, he was a lieutenant in the Tyrolean Kaiserjaeger for three years and was decorated with the Gold Medal of Courage, the highest award of its kind presented by the Austrian Army.

In 1920 an extensive remodeling and additions to the John Michael Kohler House were designed by Richard Philipp. Albrect was involved with the design and creation of the decorative stained and leaded windows and glass cabinet doors.

As an architect, his biggest job was the Waelderhaus in Kohler Village, Wisconsin (USA). John Michael Kohler, the father of the industrialist Walter Jodok Kohler also came from the Bregenzerwald. In addition to designing the Waelderhaus, Mr. Albrecht supervised construction from 1929 to 1931 and personally executed the many artistic pottery reliefs, wood cuts, maps, stained glass windows, tapestry designs, bronze statues, and other handiwork.

In 1951, he was Member of the National Geographic Society (US).

Albrecht returned to Kohler in 1957 when he executed the bronze sculptured panel in the foyer of Kohler Memorial Theater. At this time he also created the life-sized figure of Old Abe the bald eagle that was the mascot of the 8th Wisconsin Volunteer Infantry Regiment during the Civil War. The figure was carved in basswood.

In 1961 he received the honorary award and in 1968 the silver decorations of Vorarlberg.

Works 
1922: Kaiserjäger monument in Bregenz, Fluher street in Bregenz, stone reliefs
1924: war memorial chapel Bezau, chapel building, as well as wood and clay reliefs
1927 war memorial memory portal in the church of St. Nicholas at the cemetery in Egg
War memorial in the cemetery wall of Bizau
Tombs in the municipal cemetery to the taxi park in Bregenz
1929: Waelderhaus, Wisconsin, USA (opening July 26, 1931)
1932: Theresa Chapel in Ratzen, Schwarzenberg, Crucifixion
1934: War Memorial in Au
1935: Kuratienkirche St. Joseph in the district Rehmen in Au, crucifix.
1946: Chapel Bengat in Mellau, chapel buildings and facilities
1956/57: Parish Church Sts. Philip and James in Schoppernau, enlargement of the church and built a choir loft, memorial stone with portrait bust Jacob fields († 1924)
1957: plaque commemorating the Au Guild in Au
1964 Parish Church of St. Sebastian. in Langen near Bregenz, design the communion rail
Altach parish church, baptismal font and stoup with reliefs

Gallery

Bibliography 
 DEHIO-Handbuch. Die Kunstdenkmäler Österreichs: Vorarlberg. Bundesdenkmalamt (Hrsg.), Verlag Anton Schroll & Co, Wien 1983, Künstlerverzeichnis.
 Helmut Swozilek: Kaspar Albrecht (1889-1970), Ausstellung der Gemeinde Au mit dem Vorarlberger Landesmuseum, Schulhaus Au, 29. Juli - 2. September 1990, Verlag Vorarlberger Landesmuseum, Bregenz 1990

References 

Austrian architects
Austrian male sculptors
1889 births
1970 deaths
20th-century Austrian sculptors
People from Bregenz District
Austro-Hungarian Army officers
20th-century Austrian male artists